The 1949–50 Southern Football League season was the 47th in the history of the league, an English football competition.

The league consisted of 24 clubs, including all 22 clubs from the previous season, and two newly elected clubs – Headington United and Weymouth. Merthyr Tydfil were champions, winning their second Southern League title. At the end of the season the Football League expanded from 88 to 92 clubs. Six Southern League clubs applied to join, with Colchester United and Gillingham succeeding.

League table

Football League elections
As the Football League's Division Three South was expanded from 20 to 22 clubs, no League clubs put up for re-election, but two places were available for non-League clubs. Six Southern League clubs applied, with Gillingham and Colchester United topping the ballot, despite Merthyr winning the league.

References

Southern Football League seasons
S